Squaramide is the organic compound with the formula O2C4(NH2)2.  Not an amide in the usual sense, it is a derivative of squaric acid wherein two OH centers are replaced by NH2.  Squaramides refer to a large class of derivatives wherein some of the H's are replaced by organic substituents.  Exploiting their rigid planar structures, these compounds are of interest as hydrogen-bond donors in supramolecular chemistry and organocatalysis.  Squaramides exhibit 10-50x greater affinity for halides than do thioureas.

Squaramide is prepared by ammonolysis of diesters of squaric acid:
O2C4(OEt)2  + 2 NH3   →   O2C4(NH2)2  +  2 EtOH
N-Substituted squaramides are prepared similarly, using amines in place of ammonia.

References

Ketones
Enamines
Cyclobutenes